Ashok Khanna (born 26 October 1945) was an Indian cricketer from Northern Punjab. He was a right-handed batsman and played First-class cricket in India for 5 years.

First Class Career

Khanna made his First-class debut in 1962–63 season and played his last match in 1967–68.

References

External links 
 

1945 births
Indian cricketers
Living people
Northern Punjab cricketers